Quonset State Airport  is a joint civil-military public airport located on Quonset Point, in northeastern North Kingstown, Rhode Island, United States, adjacent to Narragansett Bay. It is a general aviation airport and there is no scheduled airline service available. It is included in the Federal Aviation Administration (FAA) National Plan of Integrated Airport Systems for 2017–2021, in which it is categorized as a regional general aviation facility.

It was the site of the Naval Air Station Quonset Point from 1941 until the early 1970s, when the military presence in Rhode Island was drastically scaled down.  Despite the Navy's departure, the airport remains the home of Quonset Point Air National Guard Station and the 143d Airlift Wing (143 AW) of the Rhode Island Air National Guard, flying the C-130J Hercules.  The Rhode Island Army National Guard also maintains an Army Aviation Support Facility adjacent to the Air National Guard Station for the 1st Battalion, 126th Aviation Regiment, flying the UH-60 Blackhawk.

Although most U.S. airports use the same three-letter location identifier for the FAA and IATA, Quonset State Airport is assigned OQU by the FAA but is designated NCO by the IATA.

Quonset State Airport is one of six active airports operated by the Rhode Island Airports Corporation. The other five airports include T.F. Green State Airport, North Central State Airport, Westerly State Airport, Newport State Airport, and Block Island State Airport.

In the early 1980s Providence Airline Corp had daily flights leaving Quonset to Boston, Massachusetts; Hartford County, Connecticut; Syracuse, New York; Buffalo, New York; Chicago, Illinois; and Romulus, Michigan.

On May 19, 2021, Air Force One carrying President Joe Biden landed at Quonset State Airport where he was greeted by Rhode Island Governor Dan McKee as well as Col. Adam Wiggins, the 143rd Airlift Wing Commander and other officials. He then continued on Marine One to the Coast Guard Academy in New London and returned later in the day to depart on Air Force One.

Facilities and aircraft 

The airport lies within Class D airspace and has an operating non-federal air traffic control tower (closed on Mondays).

For the 12-month period ending July 31, 2007, the airport had 20,750 aircraft operations, an average of 56 per day: 68% general aviation, 28% military and 4% air taxi. At that time there were 48 aircraft based at this airport: 60% single-engine, 4% multi-engine, 10% helicopter and 25% military.

The fixed-base operator on field is AV Ports.

The flight and aviation instruction and airplane rental company on field is Parker Aviation, LLC., which was established on field in 2012.

References

External links 
 Quonset State Airport (OQU) page from Rhode Island Airport Corp.
 
 Parker Aviation, LLC. A Rhode Island-based Aviation Training Company located at Hangar One on field.
 Photographic archive of the former Quonset Naval Air Station.
 
 

Airports in Rhode Island
Transportation buildings and structures in Washington County, Rhode Island
Buildings and structures in North Kingstown, Rhode Island